Sidi Belhassen Chedly Mausoleum is a mausoleum in Tunisia, located near the Jellaz cemetery  south of Tunis.

Description 
The mausoleum is built on the place of spiritual retreats and teaching of one of the most revered Sufi saints in the Maghreb, Abu Hassan al-Shadhili. It has been rebuilt more than a dozen times since his death in Egypt in 1258.

The mausoleum consists of two sites, the first of which, the Kabira Mamiyya tourbet, located on the highest point of the hill, is built on the place of retirement and residence of the saint and houses the symbolic tomb of Abu Hassan al-Shadhili. In its current form, it was built by Abu l-Hasan Ali I  in the 1740s, a large annex room shelters the tombs of his wife, the pious Kabira Mamiyya who gave his name to the building, and of several other women of the princely house of the Husainid dynasty

Gallery

References 

Mausoleums in Tunisia
Sufism in Africa
Sufi Islamic holy places